Prydniprovske is a village (a selo) in the Zaporizhzhia Raion (district) of Zaporizhzhia Oblast in southern Ukraine. Its population was 79 in the 2001 Ukrainian Census. Administratively, it belongs to the Lukasheve Rural Council, a local government area.

The settlement was founded in 1943 as Pryvolne; in 1950, it was renamed to Prydniprovske.

References

Populated places established in 1943
German communities in Ukraine
Populated places established in the Ukrainian Soviet Socialist Republic
Former German settlements in Zaporizhzhia Oblast
Populated places on the Dnieper in Ukraine

Zaporizhzhia Raion
Villages in Zaporizhzhia Raion